Test Building, also known as the Circle Motor Inn, is a historic commercial building in Indianapolis, Indiana.  It was built in 1925, and is a nine-story, reinforced concrete structure with 12-inch thick brick and clay tile curtain walls. It is faced with Indiana limestone and has a three-story brick penthouse and two-level basement. The mixed-use building housed the city's earliest large parking garages.

It was listed on the National Register of Historic Places in 1983.  It is in the Washington Street-Monument Circle Historic District.

References

External links

Individually listed contributing properties to historic districts on the National Register in Indiana
Commercial buildings on the National Register of Historic Places in Indiana
Commercial buildings completed in 1925
Commercial buildings in Indianapolis
National Register of Historic Places in Indianapolis
Garages (parking) on the National Register of Historic Places
Transportation buildings and structures on the National Register of Historic Places in Indiana
Transportation buildings and structures in Marion County, Indiana
1925 establishments in Indiana